Emerson William "Spike" Nelson (April 2, 1906 – October 20, 1998) was an American football player and coach. He served as the  head football coach at Mississippi State College, now Mississippi State University, in 1938 and at Yale University in 1941, compiling a career college football record of 5–13. He played college football as a tackle at the University of Iowa and was selected as a first-team tackle by the New York Sun on its 1926 College Football All-America Team.  He was also selected as a second-team All-American by the Associated Press and Central Press.

Head coaching record

References

External links
 

1906 births
1998 deaths
American football tackles
Iowa Hawkeyes football coaches
Iowa Hawkeyes football players
LSU Tigers football coaches
Mississippi State Bulldogs football coaches
Saint Mary's Pre-Flight Air Devils football coaches
Yale Bulldogs football coaches
United States Navy personnel of World War II
United States Navy officers
People from Cherokee, Iowa
Military personnel from Iowa